Gabriela Orvošová (born 28 January 2001) is a Czech volleyball player, a member of the club VK UP Olomouc.

She competed at the   2019 Women's European Volleyball League, winning a gold medal.

Sporting achievements

Clubs 
Cadet Czech Championship:
  2017
MEVZA:
  2019
  2018
Czech Championship:
  2019
  2018
Czech Cup:
  2019

National Team 
European League:
  2019
  2018

References

External links
 WorldofVolley profile
 CEV profile
 VolejbalOlomouc profile
 Women.Volleybox profile

2001 births
Living people
Czech women's volleyball players
Opposite hitters